Piedramillera is a town and municipality located in the province and autonomous community of Navarre,  Northern Spain.

References

External links
 PIEDRAMILLERA in the Bernardo Estornés Lasa - Auñamendi Encyclopedia (Euskomedia Fundazioa) 
 

Municipalities in Navarre